Chingford was a local government district in south west Essex, England from 1894 to 1965, around the town of Chingford. It was within the London suburbs, forming part of the London postal district and Metropolitan Police District. Its former area now corresponds to the northern part of the London Borough of Waltham Forest in Greater London.

Background and formation
The ancient parish of Chingford formed part of the Waltham hundred of Essex. Following the Poor Law Amendment Act 1834, Chingford was grouped into the Epping Poor Law Union and in 1837 an identical area became Epping Registration District for the purposes of the Births and Deaths Registration Act 1836. It was included in the Metropolitan Police District in 1840. The Poor Law union area was used again for the purposes of the Public Health Act 1875 and Chingford became part of the Epping Rural Sanitary District that was created in 1875. In 1894 Chingford became an urban district.

District and borough
Under a county review order in 1934, a small part of Waltham Holy Cross Urban District was transferred to Chingford. It gained the status of municipal borough in 1938.

Abolition
The Royal Commission on Local Government in Greater London considered the borough for inclusion in Greater London in 1960 and subsequently it was abolished by the London Government Act 1963. Its former area was transferred to Greater London from Essex and was combined with the Municipal Borough of Walthamstow and the Municipal Borough of Leyton to form the present-day London Borough of Waltham Forest.

References

Districts abolished by the London Government Act 1963
Districts of England created by the Local Government Act 1894
History of the London Borough of Waltham Forest
History of local government in London (1889–1965)
Municipal boroughs of England
Chingford